"Jackie Chan" is a song with vocals by Canadian rapper Preme, featuring vocals from American rapper and singer Post Malone. The track was originally featured on Preme's debut full-length album, Light of Day, released on May 4, 2018. Upon hearing the vocal in the studio, Dutch DJ Tiësto and Canadian DJ Julian Dzeko decided to produce an alternate version with crossover club appeal, for release as a single.

Tiësto and Dzeko version

This version is credited to Tiësto and Dzeko featuring Preme and Post Malone. The single was released through Musical Freedom on 18 May 2018. It was written by all of the song's performers together with Louis Bell and Luis Raposo Torres. The title of the song is a reference to the martial artist and actor of the same name. It was eventually included on Tiësto's sixth studio album, The London Sessions (2020).

Following its release as a single, "Jackie Chan" peaked at number 52 on the US Billboard Hot 100, and number one on US Billboard Dance/Mix Show Airplay chart (Tiësto's third, and the first apiece for Dzeko, Preme, and Malone). It also peaked within the top ten of the charts in several countries, including Belgium (Wallonia), Canada, Czech Republic, Denmark, Finland, Ireland, Latvia, the Netherlands, New Zealand, Poland and the United Kingdom as well as the top twenty of the charts in Australia, Austria, Belgium (Flanders), Italy, Norway, Portugal and Sweden.

Critical reception
Kat Bein of Billboard described the song as "a summer-ready anthem with a couple of cool breeze features from the singing MCs", calling it "a delightful slice of pop crossover for both the hip-hop and electronic dance entertainers".

Song structure
The song starts out with an electric guitar intro, leading up to Post Malone's first few lines. The beat adds in and Preme starts rapping. It then alternates between the two until a rise starts (at 1:14) and then Post Malone sings the phrase "now your bitch wanna kick it, Jackie Chan". This then leads to the so-called "EDM" part of the song comes in (1:19) where Post Malone and Preme both stop rapping. They start rapping 12 seconds after. The same process repeats except for the fact that the lyrics have shifted slightly.

Music video 
A lyric video for "Jackie Chan" was released on YouTube on 18 May 2018. It was directed by Katia Temkin.

The official music video for "Jackie Chan" was released on Tiësto's YouTube channel on 2 July 2018. It features Minecraft-themed animated versions of Post Malone and Preme having fun around a futuristic city driving in a limousine. The music video was directed by Jay Martin.

Charts

Weekly charts

Year-end charts

Decade-end charts

Certifications

Release history

References

2018 singles
2018 songs
Cultural depictions of Jackie Chan
Tiësto songs
Post Malone songs
Songs written by Tiësto
Songs written by Post Malone
Songs written by Louis Bell
Animated music videos
Song recordings produced by Louis Bell
Song recordings produced by Post Malone